Magdalena Caballero (July 22, 1925  March 11, 2006) was a Mexican luchadora, or professional wrestler commonly known under her ring name La Dama Enmascarada (Spanish for "The Masked Lady"). Caballero was a relative of professional wrestler Irma González as well as González's daughter Irma Aguilar although it is unclear exactly how they were related.

Caballero was one of the pioneers of women's professional wrestling in Mexico, credited as the first Mexican National Women's Champion at a time when female wrestling was banned in Mexico City. She began her career as a masked wrestler, but lost her mask in 1958 to Irma González, and would later wrestle under the mask again. She also appeared in three Lucha films: Las Lobas del Ring, Las Luchadoras contra La Momia and Las Luchadoras contra el Médico Asesino.

Biography
Magdalena Caballero was born on July 22, 1925, in Mexico. She was born into a circus family as both her parents and her grandmother all performed in various acts. Caballero's grandmother encouraged her to become a strong woman, focusing on feats of dental strength in her performances.

She met her future husband, Andrés Ramos, at the age of 15. Ramos was an animal trainer with the circus. The two later married and had six children together. The two would later divorce, leaving Caballero alone to fend for herself and her six children. With her background in the circus as a strong woman, local boxing promoters offered her several boxing matches.

Professional wrestling career
Women's wrestling in Mexico prior to the 1950s was almost non-existent. In the early 1950s, Jack O'Brien began training female wrestlers in his gym in León, Guanajuato, including Magdalena Caballero. In the ring she would work under a wrestling mask, using the ring name La Dama Enmascarada ("The Masked Lady") alongside other O'Brien trainees like Chabela Romero, La Enfermera, Irma González, and Rosita Williams. Her first verified match took place on November 16, 1951, where she wrestled La Enfermera del Médico Asesino in a Lucha de Apuestas (A "bet match"), which ended without a winner, which meant that La Dama Enmascarada kept her mask save, while La Enfermera kept her hair.

La Dama Enmascarada became the first woman to win a championship in Mexico as she won a tournament to become the first holder of the Mexican National Women's Championship in 1955. Her reign lasted less than a year as Irma González won the championship in 1955. La Dama Enmascarada regained the championship in 1958. The rivalry between La Dama and González led to a high-profile Lucha de Apuestas between the two on October 5, 1958. González won the match, and in addition to not having her hair shaved off, she forced La Dama Enmascarada to remove her mask instead. As a result of the loss, La Dama Enmascarada became the first woman in Mexico to unmask as a result of a Lucha de Apuestas loss. After the loss of her mask, she would at times wrestle under her real name and sometimes still use the "La Dama Enmascarada" name, despite not being masked anymore. Due to very few records of wrestling from that period of time being preserved, it is uncertain as to who defeated La Dama to end her second reign as the Mexican National Women's Championship. On January 22, 1961, La Dama Enmascarada defeated Irma González in yet another lucha de Apuestas match, forcing González to be shaved bald as a result. Her last known match took place in 1962, on January 14, as she teamed up with Chabela Romero to take on Irma González and Toña la Tapatía on an Empresa Mexicana de Lucha Libre show in Guadalajara. Her career in Mexico ended when she began touring Europe as part of a traveling circus for the subsequent 10 years.

Personal life
Caballero and husband Andrés Ramos had six children together before their divorce in the 1950s: Manuel, Francisca, Arturo, Andrés, Magdalena, and Teresa. Her sister would also become a professional wrestler, known as María de Jesús Caballero. She is also related to  González, began wrestling around the same time as Caballero, although it is not clear exactly how they are related. González's daughter, would also later become a professional wrestler as well, known as Irma Aguilar. Magdalena Caballero died on March 11, 2006, at the age of 80, no cause of death was published.

Champions
Mexican independent circuit
Mexican National Women's Championship (1 time)

Filmography
Caballero appeared as an actress in a supporting role, as well as being the fight coordinator for the female wrestlers in the following movies:
Las Luchadoras cotra el Médico Asesino ("Wrestling Women versus the Medical Assassin", 1963) aka. The Doctor of Doom
Las Luchadoras contra La Momia ("Wrestling Women versus the Aztec Mummy", 1964)
Las Lobas del Ring ("The she-wolves of the Ring", 1965)

Luchas de Apuestas record

References

 

1925 births
2006 deaths
20th-century professional wrestlers
Circus strongmen and strongwomen
Mexican female professional wrestlers
Masked wrestlers
Mexican National Women's Champions